The third season of the Indian Malayalam-language reality television game show Bigg Boss premiered on 14 February 2021. It is produced by Endemol Shine India under the control of Banijay and broadcast on Asianet with Mohanlal as the host. The show follows selected contestants who are isolated from the outside world for 112 days (or 16 weeks) in a custom-built house.

The show got suspended on Day 95 after Tamil Nadu Police sealed the set due to violating lockdown rules. The contestants of the show were shifted to a hotel. Meanwhile, the makers released a statement that the season three is temporarily suspended due to the rising COVID-19 cases and lockdown in Tamil Nadu and the show will be restarted soon the crisis is over.

However, the show makers has also declared that the season will have a winner, unlike the last season and the channel had started online voting featuring all 8 finalists and the one who receives the maximum number of votes will be declared as the winner. The contestants of the show are already back in Kerala, as it has been confirmed that the show cannot be resumed. On 25 July 2021, the show makers announced that the special grand finale episode, featuring host Mohanlal and the finalists was telecasted on 1 August 2021.

Production
The official announcement for Season 3 was revealed on 3 January 2021 by Tovino Thomas at the launch event for Star Singer Season 8. On 1 February 2021, the channel announced that the season will launch on 14 February 2021 with Mohanlal returning as host. The opening of the third season of "Bigg Boss" premiered on Valentine's Day 14 February 2021. Monday through Friday episodes will air at 9:30 pm. The audition for the show began in August 2020, after seven months of auditioning, 14 contestants working in different fields were shortlisted to enter the house. They were subjected to two weeks of quarantine precaution for the COVID-19 pandemic and tested negative.

House
The luxurious set of the house from the second season continued for the third season. The whole of the house is built with a Malayali touch. The traditions and culture of Kerala can be seen in the design of the house.

Eye
As usual, Bigg Boss comes with a new logo of an eye for season 3. The red colour background of the Eye is designed in a modern machinery touch by motion graphic artist Deepu Chandran (Asianet). The tag line as said in the promos of the show is "The Show Must Go On", a different one as compared to the previous two seasons.

Opening
The season premiered on 14 February 2021 on Valentine's Day. Host Mohanlal started the show inside Bigg Boss's house, where the contestants joined him. The host walked through the house but and had covered the entire area. This time, the launch episode had broadcast an AV about the housemates after their arrival and the stage performance was split into the AV. The housemates received a flower for being the Valentine for the day and a jar of chocolates when entering the house. Housemates, for the first time, had colored microphone bags with their names on them.

Housemates status
This year they have decided to put 8 Finalists (Final 8) due to the COVID.

Housemates
The participants in the order of appearance and entrance in the house are:

Original entrants
 Adoney P John, research scholar, public speaker
 Anoop Krishnan, TV actor and television presenter who is known for his stint in Asianet serial Seetha Kalyanam (TV series)
 Bhagyalakshmi, Senior Dubbing Artist who is known for dubbing more than 4000 Malayalam Films. She is a writer and social activist.
 Dimpal bhal psychologist and Fashion stylist .
 Firoz Khan Abdul Azeez, radio personality, Television presenter
 Lekshmi Jayan, singer and violinist. She was a former contestant in Asianet Idea Star Singer.
 Majiziya Bhanu,  Indian Bodybuilder and arm wrestler from Kerala who is known for her national and international achievements in Arm wrestling.
 Manikuttan, Film Actor, who prominently works in the Malayalam film industry
 Noby Marcose, Film, TV Actor, Comedian who appeared in Asianet Comedy Stars and Star Magic in Flowers Channel.
 Ramzan Muhammed,  Dancer, Actor, and the winner of the dance reality show D 4 Dance.
 Rithu Manthra, Model, actress, and singer. She has represented Kerala in Femina Miss India 2018.
 Sai Vishnu, Model
 Sandhya Manoj, Dancer, dancing teacher, and Yoga instructor.
 Soorya J Menon, Model, actress and DJ .

Wildcard entrants 
 Angel Thomas, Model and fashion designer
 Firoz Khan, an Actor, host of a prank show called Dangerous Boys and a reality show alumina who had participated in several shows such as Jodi No:1 and Thillana Thillana.
 Michelle Ann Daniel, Film actress is known for her role as Michelle in the Malayalam Films, Oru Adaar Love, Dhamaka.
 Remya Panickar, Film actress. She is well known for her role as 'Jolly Miss' in the movie, Chunkzz.
 Sajna Firoz, Television actress. She is remembered for her notable roles in television serials such as Anna Kareena, and Chackoyum Maryyum.

Prison
Each week, two housemates who did not perform well in the Luxury Budget Task, are sent to the Bigg Boss Prison. The cell does not include the luxury facilities which are in the house. It contains a metal cot and another bed on the floor.

Weekly summary

Nominations table

Notes 
Color key
  indicates the Nominees for house captaincy.
  indicates the House Captain.
  indicates that the Housemate was directly nominated for eviction prior to the regular nominations process.
  indicates that the Housemate was granted immunity from nominations.
  indicates the winner.
  indicates the first runner up.
  indicates the second runner up.
  indicates the third runner up.
  indicates the fourth runner up.
  indicates a new wildcard contestant.
  indicates that the housemate has Re-Entered.
  indicates that the Housemate was in the Secret Room.
  indicates the contestant has been Ejected.
  indicates the contestant has been Walked Out of the show.
  indicates the Eviction Free Pass has been used on a housemate.
  indicates the contestant has been Evicted.

    : No nomination and eviction procedures on week 1.
    : On Week 1 Bhagyalakshmi became the first capatin of the season 3.
    : Firoz Khan & Sajna Firoz, Michelle Daniel entered the bigg boss house as Wildcard Contestants.
    : Firoz Khan & Sajna Firoz, Michelle Daniel were exempted from the nomination and eviction procedures.
    : Angel Thomas and Remya Panicker entered the bigg boss house as Wildcard Contestants.
    : Angel Thomas and Remya Panicker were exempted from the nomination and eviction procedures.
    : Firoz Khan & Sajna Firoz, Michelle Daniel were directly nominated for Week 3, for breaking bigg boss house rules.
    : On Day 49, ex-contestant Remya Panicker re-entered the bigg boss house as a wildcard.
    : Remya Panicker was exempted from the nomination and eviction procedures.
  : Weekend episode and Eviction process for Week 8 were scrapped due to the celebration of Vishu.
  : Week 8 nominated housemates were still in the eviction process for the week 9.
 : 8th week nominated housemates directly nominated and other housemates were safe for the 9th week.
 : On Day 58 Firoz Khan and Sajna Firoz were ejected from the show for violating the rules.
 : The Week 9 eviction process was cancelled due to the Firoz Khan & Sajna Firoz ejection process.
 : On Week 10, Bigg Boss announced this time housemates having the first open nomination where housemates need to select two housemates and nominate them in front of the other housemates.
 : During a task conducted in Week 9, Firoz Azeez, Manikuttan and Ramzan Muhammed were granted immunity for the following week's nomination process.
 : On Day 64 Ramzan Muhammed rejected his nomination free card.
 : Ramzan Muhammed were directly nominated for coming three weeks, for breaking bigg boss house rules.
 : On Day 71 Manikuttan decide to quit, and later Bigg Boss announced that he is going temporarily out of the bigg boss house.
 : On Day 74 Manikuttan re-entered the bigg boss house.
 : On Day 74 Dimpal Bhal quit the show due to her father's death.
 : On Week 11, Adoney John won captaincy and become the captain of Week 12. However Adoney John got evicted on Day 77 and was directly removed from Captaincy.
 : Adoney John was given the option to select a captain between Anoop Krishnan and Rithu Manthra and he selected Anoop Krishnan as the Week 12 House Captain.
 : On Week 12, eviction process cancelled this week due to the ongoing high-risk pandemic situation.
 : Week 12 nominated housemates were still in the eviction process for the week 13
 : 12th week nominated housemates directly nominated and other housemates were safe for the 13th week.
 : On Day 88 Dimpal Bhal re-entered the bigg boss house.
 : On Week 13, Noby Marcose handed over his Captaincy to Rithu and she became the last captain of the season 3.
 : On Week 14, Bigg Boss announced this time housemates having the second open nomination where housemates need to select two housemates and nominate them in front of the other housemates.
 : On Day 95 the show stopped temporarily due to global COVID-19 pandemic situation.
 : On Day 95, Anoop Krishnan, Firoz Azeez, Dimpal Bhal, Manikuttan, Noby Marcose, Ramzan Muhammed, Rithu Manthra, Sai Vishnu were sent home due to COVID-19.
 :
 : On Week 15 Anoop Krishnan, Firoz Azeez, Dimpal Bhal, Manikuttan, Noby Marcose, Ramzan Muhammed, Rithu Manthra, Sai Vishnu were directly nominated for finale.
 : Anoop Krishnan, Firoz Azeez, Dimpal Bhal, Manikuttan, Noby Marcose, Ramzan Muhammed, Rithu Manthra, Sai Vishnu were announced as Top 8 finalists o the Bigs Season 3.
 : Noby Marcose became the 7th Runner-Up.
 : Rithu Manthra became the 6th Runner-Up.
 : Firoz Azeez became the 5th Runner-Up.
 : Anoop Krishnan became the 4th Runner-Up.
 : Ramzan Muhammed became the 3rd Runner-Up.
 : Dimpal Bhal became the 2nd Runner-Up.
 : Sai Vishnu became the 1st Runner-Up.
 : Manikuttan became the Winner.

References

External links
 

2021 Indian television seasons
Asianet (TV channel) original programming
Malayalam-language television shows